Yarmouth station was a railroad station in the Yarmouth Port section of Yarmouth, Massachusetts.

History

The original station was built in the village of Yarmouth Port when the Cape Cod Railroad extended its line from Sandwich to Hyannis in 1854. It was destroyed by a fire on November 17, 1878; the Old Colony Railroad built a replacement. 

Service past Yarmouth to Provincetown ended with the 88 stations case on July 17, 1938, with a brief revival in mid-1940. Yarmouth station was again destroyed by fire in 1941; the New York, New Haven, and Hartford Railroad built a brick replacement. It served year-round Boston–Hyannis trains until June 30, 1959, and New York–Hyannis trains including the Day Cape Codder and Neptune until 1964. This station was torn down around 1975 to make room for the warehouse of Yarmouth-based Christmas Tree Shops.

References

Further reading

External links

Yarmouth, Massachusetts
Old Colony Railroad Stations on Cape Cod
Stations along Old Colony Railroad lines
Former railway stations in Massachusetts